Mawrid is a settlement in Ras Al Khaimah, United Arab Emirates (UAE). It is located in the Wadi Asimah.

References

Populated places in the Emirate of Ras Al Khaimah